Karun Jethi (born 19 December 1983) is an Indian-born cricketer who has played three One Day Internationals and five Twenty20 Internationals for Canada.

Jethi made his ODI debut against Bermuda on 18 August 2008 in the Scotiabank series which included West Indies, Canada and Bermuda national cricket team. In that match, Jethi scored a quick fire 46 and took 2 wickets which earned him the Man of the Match award.

References

External links 

1983 births
Living people
Canada One Day International cricketers
Canada Twenty20 International cricketers
Canadian cricketers
Canadian people of Indian descent
Indian emigrants to Canada
Indian cricketers
Cricketers from Delhi